CIDT may refer to:
Cruel, inhuman or degrading treatment, a concept in international law and the laws of many countries
Mobile wireless sensor network#Topology